Thomas Henry Morgan (1857 – December 22, 1940) was an architect in the U.S. state of Georgia.

For part of his career he worked in partnership Bruce & Morgan

A number of his works, individually or in partnership, are listed on the U.S. National Register of Historic Places.

Works individually credited to him (with attribution variations) include:
Burns Cottage, 988 Alloway Pl., SE Atlanta, GA (Morgan, Thomas H.), NRHP-listed
Carnegie Library, jct. of Bellevue, Academy, and Jackson Sts. Dublin, GA (Morgan, Thomas H.), NRHP-listed
W. D. Grant Building, built 1898, Chicago style, 44 Broad St., NW Atlanta, GA (Morgan, Thomas Henry), NRHP-listed
Haralson County Courthouse, Courthouse Sq. Buchanan, GA (Morgan, Thomas H.), NRHP-listed
North Avenue Presbyterian Church, 607 Peachtree Ave., NE Atlanta, GA (Morgan, Thomas Henry), NRHP-listed

References

1857 births
1940 deaths
People from Knoxville, Tennessee
University of Tennessee alumni
Architects from Atlanta
20th-century American architects
Chicago school architects